Svidník is a town in eastern Slovakia, the capital of the Svidník District in the Prešov Region. It has a population of around 11,000.

There is a monumental Soviet Army Memorial in the city, in memory of Battle of the Dukla Pass.

Geography

History

The town arose in 1944 by merger of two formerly independent municipalities of Nižný Svidník and Vyšný Svidník. The first written mention stems from 1355 as Scyuidnyk.

Demographics
According to a 2001 census, the town had 12,428 inhabitants. 79.60% of inhabitants were Slovaks, 13.04% were Rusyns, 4.07% were Ukrainian, 1.50% were of Romani descent and 0.39% were Czechs. The religious make-up was 41.10% Greek Catholics, 25.82% Orthodox, 24.13% Roman Catholics, 5.17% people with no religious affiliation and 0.93% Lutherans.

Twin towns — sister cities

Svidník is twinned with:

 Strzyżów, Poland
 Świdnik, Poland
 Jarosław, Poland
 Sanok County, Poland
 Chrudim, Czech Republic
 Kriva Palanka, North Macedonia
 Rakhiv, Ukraine
 Vrbas, Serbia

References

External links
 
 

Cities and towns in Slovakia
Šariš